White mustard (Sinapis alba) is an annual plant of the family Brassicaceae. It is sometimes also referred to as Brassica alba or B. hirta. Grown for its seeds, used to make the condiment mustard, as fodder crop, or as a green manure, it is now widespread worldwide, although it probably originated in the Mediterranean region.

Description

Distribution
Most common in Europe, North Africa, the Middle East and Central Asia, it can be found worldwide. It has been found as far north as Greenland, and naturalized throughout Great Britain and Ireland.

Culinary uses
The yellow flowers of the plant produce glabrous or sparsely bristled seed pods. Each fruit (silique) contains roughly a half dozen seeds. The plants are harvested for their seeds just prior to the seed pods becoming ripe and bursting open (dehiscing).

They can be used whole for pickling or toasted for use in dishes. When ground and mixed with other ingredients, a paste or more standard condiment can be produced. Sinapis alba is used to make the commonplace yellow table mustard, with additional yellow coloring provided by turmeric in some formulations.

The seeds contain sinalbin, which is a thioglycoside responsible for their pungent taste. White mustard has fewer volatile oils and the flavor is considered to be milder than that produced by black mustard seeds.

In Greece, the plant's leaves are eaten during the winter, before it blooms. The blooming season of this plant (February–March) is celebrated with the Mustard Festival, a series of festivities in the wine country of California (Napa and Sonoma Counties).

Other uses
White mustard is commonly used as a cover and green manure crop in Europe (between UK and Ukraine). A large number of varieties exist, mainly differing in lateness of flowering and resistance against white beet-cyst nematode (Heterodera schachtii). Farmers prefer late-flowering varieties, which do not produce seeds, as they may become weeds in the subsequent year. Early vigor is important to cover the soil quickly to suppress weeds and protect the soil against erosion. In rotations with sugar beets, suppression of the white beet-cyst nematode is an important trait. Resistant white mustard varieties reduce nematode populations by 70-90%.

Gallery

See also
 Mustard plant
 Mustard seed

References

External links
 Sinapis alba Flowers in Israel
 
 
 
 http://www.maltawildplants.com/CRUC/Sinapis_alba.php Comprehensive profile for Sinapis alba.

Spices
Brassicaceae
Medicinal plants
Plants described in 1753